Empire Prairie is an extinct town in Andrew County, in the U.S. state of Missouri. The GNIS classifies it as a populated place.

A post office called Empire Prairie was established in 1859, and remained in operation until 1905. The community took its name from a local farm also called Empire Prairie owned by settler David Bonham.

References

Ghost towns in Missouri
Former populated places in Andrew County, Missouri